"She Drives Me Crazy" is a song  co-written and recorded by Canadian country music artist Brett Kissel. It was the second single off his eighth studio album Now or Never. A remix of the track featuring rapper Nelly was previewed in November 2020, and released on June 21, 2021.

Background
Kissel told The Boot that during the process of making his album Now or Never, "I [had written] "That's Country Music" and "Drink About Me," which was in the queue to be the first single, so I had a lot of powerful songs. I had "I'm Not Him, I'm Not Her," that I knew was gonna be on the album. I had "Coffee With Her." But I didn't have that uptempo pop banger, as I call it". Kissel remarked that on his way to write the song with fellow songwriters Emma-Lee and Karen Kosowski, he "was listening to pop music the whole way, just to get excited". He said after writing the song in 45 minutes, they were "feeling great about it, but it was so pop-heavy" and said "Oh my gosh, this is not a country song" and proceeded to add a major banjo riff to the song. Later that day, they wrote the track "Hummingbird" 
on a 1950s Gibson guitar so they "could tell the country gods that we still love country music".

Commercial performance
"She Drives Me Crazy" was certified Gold by Music Canada on July 14, 2020, with over 40,000 sales. As of November 2020, the song had received over 5.2 million streams through Spotify.

Music video
The official music video for "She Drives Me Crazy" was directed by Emma Higgins and Brett Kissel and premiered January 30, 2020. It featured a nearly all-female cast including Kissel's wife Cecilia, and their daughters Mila and Aria.

Chart performance
"She Drives Me Crazy" reached a peak of number 12 on the Billboard Canada Country chart dated July 18, 2020. It also peaked at number 78 on the Billboard Canadian Hot 100, his fifth-highest charting entry on that chart.

Certifications

References

2020 songs
2020 singles
Brett Kissel songs
Nelly songs
Songs written by Brett Kissel
Songs written by Karen Kosowski
Songs written by Emma-Lee
Warner Music Group singles